Giovanni Battista Negrone (Genoa, 22 April 1714 - Genoa, 26 January 1771) was the 170th Doge of the Republic of Genoa.

Biography 
on 16 February 1769 the Grand Council elected Battista Negrone the new doge of Genoa, the one hundred and twenty-fifth in biennial succession and the one hundred and seventy in republican history. The coronation took place in the Genoa Cathedral on 11 June. The abolition of the cloistered prisons, which were followed by the relative demolitions of the same, is recalled of his Doge's mandate; the repeal of torture, despite the support of Doge Negrone and the approval with full marks from the colleges, nevertheless found the opposition of the supreme trade unions. Almost at the end of the two-year period the doge Giovanni Battista Negrone fell ill on 26 January 1771, it was the archbishop Giovanni Lercari who administered in communion to him as requested by the doge himself. Assisted by various priests and his personal confessor, he died on the evening of 26 January 1771.

See also 

 Republic of Genoa
 Doge of Genoa

References 

18th-century Doges of Genoa
1714 births
1771 deaths